Narella (Gray, 1870) is a genus of deep-sea soft corals in the family Primnoidae (Milne Edwards, 1857). They are sessile, bottom-dwelling organisms that can be found in all ocean basins, having cosmopolitan distribution. They have a branching appearance.

History

Etymology 
The name Narella is believed to be derived from the latin nares, meaning nostril, due to the resemblance of the rows of polyps to small noses.

Discovery 
The present understanding of Narella and its members was only established in the late 20th century. Prior to that, many members of Narella were categorized into other genera. While the genus itself was described in 1870 by John Edward Gray, the first species in the genus was described in 1860, Primnoa regularis (now recognized as Narella regularis). In 1887 several new species of Narella were discovered by Edward Wright and Théophile Studer, but were described as members of new genera Stachyodes and Calypterinus. Between 1906 and 1919 many new species of Narella were discovered, though many were described as members of Stachyodes or Calypterinus. It was only in 1951 that Frederick Bayer synonymized these genera with Narella, establishing the former as junior synonyms of the latter.

Distribution 
Narella is the most species-rich genus in Primnoidae. They are found worldwide, with species occurring in the Atlantic, the Pacific, the Hawaiian Islands, the Indian Ocean, the Galápagos, and off the coast of Antarctica. While there have been a few species that are found in multiple regions, in general each region has a distinct group of sympatric species. This, along with Narella's high rate of adaptive radiation has led to researchers believing it to have many undiscovered species.

Morphology 
There are over 50 recognized species of Narella, but its type taxon is Narella regularis. Narella are distinguished from other members of Primnoidae by their conspicuous polyps which have very distinct large scales, also called sclerites. Most species of Narella have 16 - 18 sclerites that are always arranged in pairs. Polyps in members of Primnoidae are covered at the tip by opercular scales. In Narella, these eight opercular scales are paired together, giving them a symmetrical appearance. Physical differences amongst individual species of Narella primarily involve the shape and texture of the scales. These characteristics are difficult to identify in the field thus most broader identification guides focus on branching instead. 

The axis of corals in this genus are made of aragonite, while their spicules are made of high Mg calcite. They anchor themselves to hard substrates using calcareous discoid holdfasts.

Species 
The following are species currently recognized in the genus.

References

Primnoidae
Octocorallia genera